"Song for the Lonely" (originally titled "(This is) A Song for the Lonely") is a song by American singer Cher from her twenty-fourth studio album, Living Proof (2001). It was written by Mark Taylor, Paul Barry and Steve Torch, and produced by Taylor. It released on March 19, 2002, as the second international single from the album, while in North America it was released as the lead single, by Warner Bros. Records and WEA. "Song for the Lonely" is a dance-pop song which was initially written as a love song, but after the September 11 attacks, Cher eventually saw it in a different way.

"Song for the Lonely" was met with positive reviews, with music commentators complimenting its heartfelt lyrics and beat. Commercially, the song was a disappointment on the US Billboard Hot 100, peaking at number 85, but it topped the Dance/Electronic Singles Sales and the Dance Club Songs charts. It also reached the top forty in The Czech Republic and Romania. The accompanying music video for "Song for the Lonely" was recorded in New York City under the direction of Stu Maschwitz, and depicts Cher walking through the streets of the city since the 18th century until the modern days, while she is joined by several people from those times. To promote the song, Cher performed it on the American Music Awards of 2002, The Tonight Show with Jay Leno, and later included it on the setlists of her Living Proof: The Farewell Tour (2002–05) and her concert residency Cher (2008–11).

Background and release

Cher recorded "Song for the Lonely" in the summer of 2001 in London and intended to include it on her twenty-fourth studio album Living Proof (2001), and it immediately became her favorite song from the album. However, after the September 11 attacks, she began thinking of it in a different way. In an interview with Larry King Live she said that after the attacks, she was listening to the album and when the track began, all of a sudden it took on a completely different meaning for her, especially because of the "when heroes fall in love and war, they live forever" lyric. Cher commented that "Song for the Lonely" was one of the best tracks she has ever had the opportunity to sing, because according to her, "we still lived in a world of innocence" before the attacks. According to the album liner notes, "Song for the Lonely" is "dedicated to the courageous people of New York especially the fire fighters, the police, Mayor Giuliani, Governor Pataki and my friend Liz".

Since its release, the public's reaction to "Song for the Lonely" had been positive. James Lonten, manager of a Borders Books & Music store in New York City, which had been stocking Living Proof since its European release, commented, "That goes without saying. We play the track in-store, and it literally stops people dead in their tracks. It's an instantly affecting, highly emotional song". John Boulos, senior vice-president of promotion at Warner Bros. Records, commented that they were not exploiting the September 11 attacks as a selling point to the single, but it had drawn the interest of people. "We simply feel that we have an incredible song by a truly legendary artist. That's a pretty potent combination to take it to the street", he said. "Song for the Lonely" served as the lead American single from Living Proof, being released on March 19, 2002. In the European and international editions of Living Proof, it is listed as "(This Is) A Song for the Lonely".

Composition

"Song for the Lonely" is a guitar-laden dance-pop song. Mark Taylor and Paul Barry, who also worked on her previous hit single "Believe" (1998), wrote the track, "giving the song a frenetic, knee-bobbing urgency that will wash the gray out of any winter day", according to Billboards Chuck Taylor. The music commentator also noted that the lack of vocoder, which had become a signature on Cher's songs, allowed Cher to "foster a grin" with opening notes, until the song reaches the chorus – which Taylor said it was one of the cathiest since Hanson's "MMMBop" (1997) – and "explodes into a rhythmic tantrum". When Cher recorded the track, she thought of it as a love song, but after the September 11 attacks, the singer felt the song was right for the occasion. "Since the world has changed so dramatically, the lyrics have a different weight. They're heavier, yet they're comforting at the same time. Over the past month or so, I've had a number of people tell me that the song has helped them cope. What a humbling compliment", she commented. Tony Peregrin from PopMatters noted that the song delivers "a message that is achingly emotional and somber".

Critical reception
"Song for the Lonely" received generally positive reviews from music critics. While reviewing Living Proof, Billboards Michael Paoletta commented that the song was "an empowering jam that deserves to rock the world just as 'Believe' did". In a separate review for the single, Chuck Taylor from the same magazine opined that "anyone who thought 'Believe' was merely a stroke of good fortune on Cher's mile-long scorecard will be singing a different tune after one spin of the life-affirming '(This Is) A Song for the Lonely '", because "this track is so good, in fact, that it's up for debate as to whether it actually tops that previous winner". He finished his review by writing that "Boy, is "Song for the Lonely" ever an elixir for whatever ails you, a joyous romp with such mass appeal that its destination at the top of the charts seems a given".

Kerry L. Smith from AllMusic praised the song, saying, "Cher takes a brief break from her inquisitiveness about love to dedicate the bold, heartfelt opening track, in honor of the September 11th tragedy, 'Song for the Lonely'". Barry Walters of Rolling Stone also agreed by writing that it "clearly intends to evoke September 11th", adding that "coming from a willfully wiggy billion-dollar diva, this noble stuff feels calculated, particularly when it's presented in such a sparkling, showbizzy package". Metro Weeklys Gordon Ashenhurst called it a "rousing lead single", while Sal Cinquemani from Slant Magazine noted that it "wisely abandons such (otherwise welcomed) electronic shenanigans for a pure and impassioned performance". Tony Peregrin of PopMatters deemed the song "an infectious, energetic track that rides the waves of predictable synth pads and pulsating beats".

Commercial performance
In the United States, "Song for the Lonely" debuted at its peak of number 85 on the Billboard Hot 100, on the issue dated April 6, 2002. It additionally spent six weeks inside the chart. The song attained better positions in other component charts, such as topping both the Dance/Electronic Singles Sales and the Dance Club Songs charts, as well as peaking within the top 20 on the Adult Contemporary chart, and peaking in the top 40 on the Adult Top 40 and Mainstream Top 40. "Song for the Lonely" also reached number 18 on the digital charts in Canada, and although the song was only released in North America, it reached number 39 in Romania.

Music video

The accompanying music video for "Song for the Lonely" was directed by Stu Maschwitz, and was filmed in the streets of New York City in December 2001. A first-time director and an architecture enthusiast, Maschwitz sent Warner Bros. Records an idea for the video, featuring a Cher-guided tour through New York City's history, exemplified by a multiple reverse-timelapses of some of the great buildings of the city rising up before the viewer's eyes. After receiving news that he got the job following the singer's personal liking for the project, they would start filming the following weeks. The crew received special permission from Mayor Rudy Giuliani's office for live audio playback in the streets of Manhattan, a practice that had recently been outlawed.

Cher had done her own makeup, as her makeup artist Kevyn Aucoin was nowhere to be found due to his struggling with a terminal illness. At one point of the shooting, they needed to cover some parts of the streets with big, loud smoke machines. As the attacks were still a fresh and painful memory for the citizens, complaints about the smoke started coming in. The police officer manning the intersection gave word that they would have to shut down their atmospheric effects, but they still had one more shot. The director solved this by taking Cher and the script supervisor's camera, and autographing a polaroid to the cop, to continue the last smoked-up shooting.

The video starts in sepia tone, featuring Cher walking around the streets of New York City. While the setting for the start of the video is in the 18th century, the singer is dressed in modern-day clothes. The video progresses to black and white, and then to color, as the times for the setting of the video change to the 19th century through various eras to the 20th century. As the timeline changes, buildings around New York are shown being constructed. The video is intercept with shots of Cher dressed in white, which is overlaid in some shots, as well as shots of New York City from the air. People from each stage of the development of the city join Cher as she walks the streets until at the end, there is a large crowd of people from all eras. In 2002, the video was released on VHS to serve as promotion in the United States. An alternative version for the video for "Song for the Lonely" was included on the DVD The Very Best of Cher: The Video Hits Collection (2004).

Live performances
In order to promote the song and its accompanying album, Cher made a number of performances for "Song for the Lonely". She opened the 2002 American Music Awards on January 9, 2002 with a performance of the song, accompanied by dancers and wearing a blonde wig. She also appeared on The Rosie O'Donnell Show, The Tonight Show with Jay Leno, The Oprah Winfrey Show, Late Show with David Letterman and VH1 Divas promoting the song. It was later added to Cher's 2002–05 Living Proof: The Farewell Tour setlist. During the first four legs of the tour, as the second song on the setlist; the performance for the song began when the singer's back-up dancers removed her headdress and robe to unveil a revealing midriff-baring vest and beaded harem pants. After dropping it for five legs, the song was re-added only on the last show at Hollywood Bowl in Los Angeles on May 2, 2005, where it was used as tour finale. Cher also performed the song on the 2008–11 concert residency Cher, held at Caesars Palace in Las Vegas, Nevada but only for a couple of weeks.

Usage in media
In 2005, "Song for the Lonely" was used internationally in television advertisements for Weight Watchers showing overweight women. However, the choice of song, suggesting that the overweight women were desperate, lonely and unloved, raised complaints, and the advert was soon edited to include only the instrumental of the song. "Song for the Lonely" was also included in the jukebox musical The Cher Show (2018). A recording of the song appears in the Broadway musical Bloody Bloody Andrew Jackson.

Track listing 
US CD maxi single
 "Song for the Lonely" (Almighty Mix) – 8:46
 "Song for the Lonely" (Illicit Vocal Mix) – 8:09
 "Song for the Lonely" (Thunderpuss Club Mix) – 8:43
 "Song for the Lonely" (Thunderpuss Sunrise Mix) – 8:25
 "Song for the Lonely" (Almighty Radio Edit) – 3:34
 "Song for the Lonely" (Illicit Radio) – 3:51
 "Song for the Lonely" (Thunderpuss Club Mix Radio Edit) – 4:06

Credits and personnel
Credits adapted from Living Proof and CD maxi single liner notes.

 Cher – vocals
Mark Taylor – songwriter, producer, mixing
Paul Barry – songwriter, guitar
Steve Torch – songwriter
Tracer Ackerman – background vocals
Adam Phillips – guitar
Jong uk Yoon – assistant
Christian Saint Val – assistant
Neil Tucker – assistant
 SMOG Design, Inc. – art direction, design
 Barrie Goshko – art direction

Charts

Weekly charts

Year-end charts

See also
 List of number-one dance singles of 2002 (U.S.)

Notes

References

External links
Cher.com

Cher songs
2002 singles
2001 songs
Music about the September 11 attacks
Songs written by Mark Taylor (record producer)
Songs about loneliness
Songs written by Paul Barry (songwriter)
Song recordings produced by Mark Taylor (record producer)
Songs written by Steve Torch
Rudy Giuliani